Camille Balanche (born 1 March 1990) is a Swiss cyclist. In 2020, she won the women's downhill race at the UCI Mountain Bike & Trials World Championships held in Leogang, Austria. She is the first Swiss rider to win a Downhill world title.

Biography 
Daughter of Gérald Balanche and Nacéra Larfi Balance, Camille Balanche was born in Le Locle and grew up in La Chaux-de-Fonds. At the age of 12, she began her sporting career in ice hockey at the La Chaux-de-Fonds Hockey Club, before joining Montréal once she could no longer play in men's teams. In 2010, she was selected to play for Switzerland in the Olympic Games. 

Returning after the games, she started studying in the Federal Sporting School of Macolin and stoped ice hockey. In 2014, on the side of her studies, she discovered cycling and began a career in enduro. She won the first Swiss Cup in the discipline, joining the international field.

In 2017, she began a new career in downhill, winning a bronze medal during the 2018 European Championships. She became European downhill champion the following year.

In 2020, she became downhill world champion.

Personal life 
Balanche has been in a relationship since 2017 with Emilie Siegenthaler, a fellow downhill mountain bike racer.

References

External links 
 

Living people
1990 births
Place of birth missing (living people)
Swiss female cyclists
Swiss mountain bikers
Downhill mountain bikers
20th-century Swiss women
21st-century Swiss women